Karin Margareta Sofia Ödlund (22 February 1959 – 1 April 2005) was a Swedish footballer. Ödlund was a member of the Swedish national team that won the 1984 European Competition for Women's Football. In November 2007 she was named among 11 nominees for the Medelpads Fotbollförbund's best ever player.

References

1959 births
2005 deaths
Damallsvenskan players
Swedish women's footballers
Sweden women's international footballers
Women's association football forwards
UEFA Women's Championship-winning players